In mathematics, the quaternion number system extends the complex numbers. Quaternions were first described by the Irish mathematician William Rowan Hamilton in 1843 and applied to mechanics in three-dimensional space. Hamilton defined a quaternion as the quotient of two directed lines in a three-dimensional space, or, equivalently, as the quotient of two vectors. Multiplication of quaternions is noncommutative.

Quaternions are generally represented in the form

Quaternions are used in pure mathematics, but also have practical uses in applied mathematics, particularly for calculations involving three-dimensional rotations, such as in three-dimensional computer graphics, computer vision, and crystallographic texture analysis. They can be used alongside other methods of rotation, such as Euler angles and rotation matrices, or as an alternative to them, depending on the application.

In modern mathematical language, quaternions form a four-dimensional associative normed division algebra over the real numbers, and therefore a ring, being both a division ring and a domain.

According to the Frobenius theorem, the algebra  is one of only two finite-dimensional division rings containing a proper subring isomorphic to the real numbers; the other being the complex numbers. These rings are also Euclidean Hurwitz algebras, of which the quaternions are the largest associative algebra (and hence the largest ring). Further extending the quaternions yields the non-associative octonions, which is the last normed division algebra over the real numbers. (The sedenions, the extension of the octonions, have zero divisors and so cannot be a normed division algebra.)

The unit quaternions can be thought of as a choice of a group structure on the 3-sphere  that gives the group Spin(3), which is isomorphic to SU(2) and also to the universal cover of SO(3).

History 

Quaternions were introduced by Hamilton in 1843. Important precursors to this work included Euler's four-square identity (1748) and Olinde Rodrigues' parameterization of general rotations by four parameters (1840), but neither of these writers treated the four-parameter rotations as an algebra. Carl Friedrich Gauss had also discovered quaternions in 1819, but this work was not published until 1900.

Hamilton knew that the complex numbers could be interpreted as points in a plane, and he was looking for a way to do the same for points in three-dimensional space. Points in space can be represented by their coordinates, which are triples of numbers, and for many years he had known how to add and subtract triples of numbers. However, for a long time, he had been stuck on the problem of multiplication and division. He could not figure out how to calculate the quotient of the coordinates of two points in space.

The great breakthrough in quaternions finally came on Monday 16 October 1843 in Dublin, when Hamilton was on his way to the Royal Irish Academy to preside at a council meeting. As he walked along the towpath of the Royal Canal with his wife, the concepts behind quaternions were taking shape in his mind. When the answer dawned on him, Hamilton could not resist the urge to carve the formula for the quaternions,

into the stone of Brougham Bridge as he paused on it. Although the carving has since faded away, there has been an annual pilgrimage since 1989 called the Hamilton Walk for scientists and mathematicians who walk from Dunsink Observatory to the Royal Canal bridge in remembrance of Hamilton's discovery.

On the following day, Hamilton wrote a letter to his friend and fellow mathematician, John T. Graves, describing the train of thought that led to his discovery. This letter was later published in a letter to the London, Edinburgh, and Dublin Philosophical Magazine and Journal of Science; Hamilton states:

Hamilton called a quadruple with these rules of multiplication a quaternion, and he devoted most of the remainder of his life to studying and teaching them. Hamilton's treatment is more geometric than the modern approach, which emphasizes quaternions' algebraic properties. He founded a school of "quaternionists", and he tried to popularize quaternions in several books. The last and longest of his books, Elements of Quaternions, was 800 pages long; it was edited by his son and published shortly after his death.

After Hamilton's death, the Scottish mathematical physicist  Peter Tait became the chief exponent of quaternions. At this time, quaternions were a mandatory examination topic in Dublin. Topics in physics and geometry that would now be described using vectors, such as kinematics in space and Maxwell's equations, were described entirely in terms of quaternions. There was even a professional research association, the Quaternion Society, devoted to the study of quaternions and other hypercomplex number systems.

From the mid-1880s, quaternions began to be displaced by vector analysis, which had been developed by Josiah Willard Gibbs, Oliver Heaviside, and Hermann von Helmholtz. Vector analysis described the same phenomena as quaternions, so it borrowed some ideas and terminology liberally from the literature on quaternions. However, vector analysis was conceptually simpler and notationally cleaner, and eventually quaternions were relegated to a minor role in mathematics and physics. A side-effect of this transition is that Hamilton's work is difficult to comprehend for many modern readers. Hamilton's original definitions are unfamiliar and his writing style was wordy and difficult to follow.

However, quaternions have had a revival since the late 20th century, primarily due to their utility in describing spatial rotations. The representations of rotations by quaternions are more compact and quicker to compute than the representations by matrices. In addition, unlike Euler angles, they are not susceptible to "gimbal lock". For this reason, quaternions are used in computer graphics, computer vision, robotics, control theory, signal processing, attitude control, physics, bioinformatics, molecular dynamics, computer simulations, and orbital mechanics. For example, it is common for the attitude control systems of spacecraft to be commanded in terms of quaternions.  Quaternions have received another boost from number theory because of their relationships with the quadratic forms.

Quaternions in physics 
P.R. Girard's 1984 essay The quaternion group and modern physics discusses some roles of quaternions in physics. The essay shows how various physical covariance groups, namely , the Lorentz group, the general theory of relativity group, the Clifford algebra  and the conformal group, can easily be related to the quaternion group in modern algebra. Girard began by discussing group representations and by representing some space groups of crystallography. He proceeded to kinematics of rigid body motion. Next he used complex quaternions (biquaternions) to represent the Lorentz group of special relativity, including the Thomas precession. He cited five authors, beginning with Ludwik Silberstein, who used a potential function of one quaternion variable to express Maxwell's equations in a single differential equation. Concerning general relativity, he expressed the Runge–Lenz vector. He mentioned the Clifford biquaternions (split-biquaternions) as an instance of Clifford algebra. Finally, invoking the reciprocal of a biquaternion, Girard described conformal maps on spacetime. Among the fifty references, Girard included Alexander Macfarlane and his Bulletin of the Quaternion Society. In 1999 he showed how Einstein's equations of general relativity could be formulated within a Clifford algebra that is directly linked to quaternions.

The finding of 1924 that in quantum mechanics the spin of an electron and other matter particles (known as spinors) can be described using quaternions (in the form of the famous Pauli spin matrices) furthered their interest; quaternions helped to understand how rotations of electrons by 360° can be discerned from those by 720° (the "Plate trick"). , their use has not overtaken rotation groups.

Definition 
A quaternion is an expression of the form 

Hamilton describes a quaternion , as consisting of a scalar part and a vector part. A quaternion that equals its real part (that is, its vector part is zero) is called a scalar or real quaternion, and is identified with the corresponding real number. That is, the real numbers are embedded in the quaternions. (More properly, the field of real numbers is isomorphic to a subset of the quaternions. The field of complex numbers is also isomorphic to three subsets of quaternions.) A quaternion that equals its vector part is called a vector quaternion.

and the componentwise scalar multiplication

A multiplicative group structure, called the Hamilton product, denoted by juxtaposition, can be defined on the quaternions in the following way:
The real quaternion  is the identity element.
In algebraic terminology this is to say that the field of real quaternions are the center of this quaternion algebra.
The product is first given for the basis elements (see next subsection), and then extended to all quaternions by using the distributive property and the center property of the real quaternions. The Hamilton product is not commutative, but is associative, thus the quaternions form an associative algebra over the real numbers.
Additionally, every nonzero quaternion has an inverse with respect to the Hamilton product: 
Thus the quaternions form a division algebra.

Multiplication of basis elements 

The products of other basis elements are

Combining these rules,

Center 
The center of a noncommutative ring is the subring of elements  such that  for every . The center of the quaternion algebra is the subfield of real quaternions. In fact, it is a part of the definition that the real quaternions belong to the center. Conversely, if  belongs to the center, then

A similar computation with  instead of  shows that one has also . Thus  is a real quaternion.

The quaternions form a division algebra. This means that the non-commutativity of multiplication is the only property that makes quaternions different from a field. This non-commutativity has some unexpected consequences, among them that a polynomial equation over the quaternions can have more distinct solutions than the degree of the polynomial. For example, the equation  has infinitely many quaternion solutions, which are the quaternions  such that . Thus these "roots of –1" form a unit sphere in the three-dimensional space of vector quaternions.

Hamilton product 
The distributive law makes it possible to expand the product so that it is a sum of products of basis elements. This gives the following expression:

Now the basis elements can be multiplied using the rules given above to get:

The product of two rotation quaternions will be equivalent to the rotation  followed by the rotation

Scalar and vector parts 
Even though every quaternion can be viewed as a vector in a four-dimensional vector space, it is common to refer to the vector part as vectors in three-dimensional space. With this convention, a vector is the same as an element of the vector space 

Hamilton also called vector quaternions right quaternions and real numbers (considered as quaternions with zero vector part) scalar quaternions.

If a quaternion is divided up into a scalar part and a vector part, that is,

then the formulas for addition and multiplication are

where "" and "" denote respectively the dot product and the cross product.

Conjugation, the norm, and reciprocal 

Conjugation of quaternions is analogous to conjugation of complex numbers and to transposition (also known as reversal) of elements of Clifford algebras. To define it, let  be a quaternion. Conjugation is an involution, meaning that it is its own inverse, so conjugating an element twice returns the original element. The conjugate of a product of two quaternions is the product of the conjugates in the reverse order.

 
The conjugation of a quaternion, in stark contrast to the complex setting, can be expressed with multiplication and addition of quaternions:

Conjugation can be used to extract the scalar and vector parts of a quaternion.

The square root of the product of a quaternion with its conjugate is called its norm and is denoted  (Hamilton called this quantity the tensor of q, but this conflicts with the modern meaning of "tensor"). In formulas, this is expressed as follows:

This is always a non-negative real number, and it is the same as the Euclidean norm on  considered as the vector space . Multiplying a quaternion by a real number scales its norm by the absolute value of the number. That is, if  is real, then

This is a special case of the fact that the norm is multiplicative, meaning that

Multiplicativity is a consequence of the formula for the conjugate of a product.
Alternatively it follows from the identity

(where  denotes the usual imaginary unit) and hence from the multiplicative property of determinants of square matrices.

This makes  a metric space.
Addition and multiplication are continuous in regard to the associated metric topology.
This follows with exactly the same proof as for the real numbers  from the fact that  is a normed algebra.

Unit quaternion 

A unit quaternion is a quaternion of norm one. Dividing a non-zero quaternion  by its norm produces a unit quaternion  called the versor of :

Every quaternion has a polar decomposition .

Using conjugation and the norm makes it possible to define the reciprocal of a non-zero quaternion.

Hence, the notation  is ambiguous because it does not specify whether  divides on the left or the right (whether  multiplies  on its left or its right).

Algebraic properties 

The set  of all quaternions is a vector space over the real numbers with dimension 4. Multiplication of quaternions is associative and distributes over vector addition, but with the exception of the scalar subset, it is not commutative. Therefore, the quaternions  are a non-commutative, associative algebra over the real numbers. Even though  contains copies of the complex numbers, it is not an associative algebra over the complex numbers.

Because it is possible to divide quaternions, they form a division algebra. This is a structure similar to a field except for the non-commutativity of multiplication. Finite-dimensional associative division algebras over the real numbers are very rare. The quaternions are also an example of a composition algebra and of a unital Banach algebra.

Because the product of any two basis vectors is plus or minus another basis vector, the set  forms a group under multiplication. This non-abelian group is called the quaternion group and is denoted .

Quaternions and the space geometry 
The vector part of a quaternion can be interpreted as a coordinate vector in  therefore, the algebraic operations of the quaternions reflect the geometry of  Operations such as the vector dot and cross products can be defined in terms of quaternions, and this makes it possible to apply quaternion techniques wherever spatial vectors arise. A useful application of quaternions has been to interpolate the orientations of key-frames in computer graphics.

For this reason, conjugation is sometimes called the spatial inverse.

It can also be expressed in a component-free manner as

 

This is equal to the scalar parts of the products . Note that their vector parts are different.

(Recall that the orientation is necessary to determine the sign.) It also has the formula

For the commutator, of two vector quaternions one obtains

In general, let  and  be quaternions and write

Then we have the formula

This shows that the noncommutativity of quaternion multiplication comes from the multiplication of vector quaternions. It also shows that two quaternions commute if and only if their vector parts are collinear. Hamilton showed that this product computes the third vertex of a spherical triangle from two given vertices and their associated arc-lengths, which is also an algebra of points in Elliptic geometry.

Also see Quaternions and spatial rotation for more information about modeling three-dimensional rotations using quaternions.

See Hanson (2005) for visualization of quaternions.

Matrix representations 
Just as complex numbers can be represented as matrices, so can quaternions. There are at least two ways of representing quaternions as matrices in such a way that quaternion addition and multiplication correspond to matrix addition and matrix multiplication. One is to use 2 × 2 complex matrices, and the other is to use 4 × 4 real matrices. In each case, the representation given is one of a family of linearly related representations.

Using 2 × 2 complex matrices, the quaternion  can be represented as

 

Note that the "i" of the complex numbers is distinct from the "i" of the quaternions.

This representation has the following properties:
For example, setting  produces a diagonal complex matrix representation of complex numbers, and setting  produces a real matrix representation.
 The norm of a quaternion (the square root of the product with its conjugate, as with complex numbers) is the square root of the determinant of the corresponding matrix.
 The conjugate of a quaternion corresponds to the conjugate transpose of the matrix.
 By restriction this representation yields an isomorphism between the subgroup of unit quaternions and their image SU(2). Topologically, the unit quaternions are the 3-sphere, so the underlying space of SU(2) is also a 3-sphere. The group  is important for describing spin in quantum mechanics; see Pauli matrices.
 There is a strong relation between quaternion units and Pauli matrices. Multiplying any two Pauli matrices always yields a quaternion unit matrix, all of them except for −1. One obtains −1 via ; e.g. the last equality is 

Using 4 × 4 real matrices, that same quaternion can be written as

For example, the same quaternion can also be represented as

There exist 48 distinct matrix representations of this form in which one of the matrices represents the scalar part and the other three are all skew-symmetric.
In this representation, the conjugate of a quaternion corresponds to the transpose of the matrix. The fourth power of the norm of a quaternion is the determinant of the corresponding matrix. As with the 2 × 2 complex representation above, complex numbers can again be produced by constraining the coefficients suitably; for example, as block diagonal matrices with two 2 × 2 blocks by setting .

Each 4×4 matrix representation of quaternions corresponds to a multiplication table of unit quaternions. For example, the last matrix representation given above corresponds to the multiplication table

which is isomorphic — through  — to

Constraining any such multiplication table to have the identity in the first row and column and for the signs of the row headers to be opposite to those of the column headers, then there are 3 possible choices for the second column (ignoring sign), 2 possible choices for the third column (ignoring sign), and 1 possible choice for the fourth column (ignoring sign); that makes 6 possibilities. Then, the second column can be chosen to be either positive or negative, the third column can be chosen to be positive or negative, and the fourth column can be chosen to be positive or negative, giving 8 possibilities for the sign. Multiplying the possibilities for the letter positions and for their signs yields 48.

Lagrange’s four-square theorem 

Quaternions are also used in one of the proofs of Lagrange's four-square theorem in number theory, which states that every nonnegative integer is the sum of four integer squares. As well as being an elegant theorem in its own right, Lagrange's four square theorem has useful applications in areas of mathematics outside number theory, such as combinatorial design theory. The quaternion-based proof uses Hurwitz quaternions, a subring of the ring of all quaternions for which there is an analog of the Euclidean algorithm.

Quaternions as pairs of complex numbers 

Quaternions can be represented as pairs of complex numbers. From this perspective, quaternions are the result of applying the Cayley–Dickson construction to the complex numbers. This is a generalization of the construction of the complex numbers as pairs of real numbers.

Let  be a two-dimensional vector space over the complex numbers.

Using  as an abbreviated notation for the product  leads to the same rules for multiplication as the usual quaternions. Therefore, the above vector of complex numbers corresponds to the quaternion .

Square roots

Square roots of −1 
In the complex numbers,  there are just two numbers, i and −i, whose square is −1 . In  there are infinitely many square roots of minus one: the quaternion solution for the square root of −1 is the unit sphere in  To see this, let  be a quaternion, and assume that its square is −1.

The latter is impossible because a is a real number and the first equation would imply that   Therefore,  and  In other words: A quaternion squares to −1 if and only if it is a vector quaternion with norm 1. By definition, the set of all such vectors forms the unit sphere.

Only negative real quaternions have infinitely many square roots. All others have just two (or one in the case of 0).

As a union of complex planes 
Each pair of square roots of −1 creates a distinct copy of the complex numbers inside the quaternions.  If  then the copy is determined by the function

Decompose the vector part further as the product of its norm and its versor:

A straightforward verification shows that

defines an injective homomorphism of normed algebras from  into the quaternions. Under this homomorphism,  is the image of the complex number .

As  is the union of the images of all these homomorphisms, this allows viewing the quaternions as a union of complex planes intersecting on the real line. Each of these complex planes contains exactly one pair of antipodal points of the sphere of square roots of minus one.

Commutative subrings 
The relationship of quaternions to each other within the complex subplanes of  can also be identified and expressed in terms of commutative subrings.

Square roots of arbitrary quaternions 

Any quaternion  (represented here in scalar–vector representation) has at least one square root  which solves the equation . Looking at the scalar and vector parts in this equation separately yields two equations, which when solved gives the solutions

For any scalar quaternion , this equation provides the correct square roots if  is interpreted as an arbitrary unit vector.

Functions of a quaternion variable

Like functions of a complex variable, functions of a quaternion variable suggest useful physical models. For example, the original electric and magnetic fields described by Maxwell were functions of a quaternion variable. Examples of other functions include the extension of the Mandelbrot set and Julia sets into 4-dimensional space.

Exponential, logarithm, and power functions
Given a quaternion,

the exponential is computed as

and the logarithm is

It follows that the polar decomposition of a quaternion may be written

where the angle 

and the unit vector  is defined by:

Any unit quaternion may be expressed in polar form as:

The power of a quaternion raised to an arbitrary (real) exponent  is given by:

Geodesic norm

This angle can also be computed from the quaternion dot product without the logarithm as:

Three-dimensional and four-dimensional rotation groups

The word "conjugation", besides the meaning given above, can also mean taking an element  to  where  is some non-zero quaternion. All elements that are conjugate to a given element (in this sense of the word conjugate) have the same real part and the same norm of the vector part. (Thus the conjugate in the other sense is one of the conjugates in this sense.) 

Thus the multiplicative group of non-zero quaternions acts by conjugation on the copy of  consisting of quaternions with real part equal to zero. Conjugation by a unit quaternion (a quaternion of absolute value 1) with real part  is a rotation by an angle , the axis of the rotation being the direction of the vector part. The advantages of quaternions are: 

 Avoiding gimbal lock, a problem with systems such as Euler angles.
 Faster and more compact than matrices.
 Nonsingular representation (compared with Euler angles for example).
 Pairs of unit quaternions represent a rotation in 4D space (see Rotations in 4-dimensional Euclidean space: Algebra of 4D rotations).

The set of all unit quaternions (versors) forms a 3-sphere  and a group (a Lie group) under multiplication, double covering the group  of real orthogonal 3×3 matrices of determinant 1 since two unit quaternions correspond to every rotation under the above correspondence. See plate trick.

The image of a subgroup of versors  is a point group, and conversely, the preimage of a point group is a subgroup of versors. The preimage of a finite point group is called by the same name, with the prefix binary. For instance, the preimage of the icosahedral group is the binary icosahedral group.

The set  is a ring (in fact a domain) and a lattice and is called the ring of Hurwitz quaternions. There are 24 unit quaternions in this ring, and they are the vertices of a regular 24 cell with Schläfli symbol  They correspond to the double cover of the rotational symmetry group of the regular tetrahedron. Similarly, the vertices of a regular 600 cell with Schläfli symbol } can be taken as the unit icosians, corresponding to the double cover of the rotational symmetry group of the regular icosahedron. The double cover of the rotational symmetry group of the regular octahedron corresponds to the quaternions that represent the vertices of the disphenoidal 288-cell.

Quaternion algebras 

The Quaternions can be generalized into further algebras called quaternion algebras.

Quaternions as the even part of  

The usefulness of quaternions for geometrical computations can be generalised to other dimensions by identifying the quaternions as the even part  of the Clifford algebra   This is an associative multivector algebra built up from fundamental basis elements  using the product rules

If these fundamental basis elements are taken to represent vectors in 3D space, then it turns out that the reflection of a vector  in a plane perpendicular to a unit vector  can be written:

Two reflections make a rotation by an angle twice the angle between the two reflection planes, so

corresponds to a rotation of 180° in the plane containing σ1 and σ2.  This is very similar to the corresponding quaternion formula,

One natural identification is

and it is straightforward to confirm that this preserves the Hamilton relations

In this picture, so-called "vector quaternions" (that is, pure imaginary quaternions) correspond not to vectors but to bivectors – quantities with magnitude and orientations associated with particular 2D planes rather than 1D directions.

This reasoning extends further. In the Clifford algebra  there are six bivector basis elements, since with four different basic vector directions, six different pairs and therefore six different linearly independent planes can be defined. Rotations in such spaces using these generalisations of quaternions, called rotors, can be very useful for applications involving homogeneous coordinates.  But it is only in 3D that the number of basis bivectors equals the number of basis vectors, and each bivector can be identified as a pseudovector.

There are several advantages for placing quaternions in this wider setting:
 Rotors are a natural part of geometric algebra and easily understood as the encoding of a double reflection.
 In geometric algebra, a rotor and the objects it acts on live in the same space. This eliminates the need to change representations and to encode new data structures and methods, which is traditionally required when augmenting linear algebra with quaternions.
 Rotors are universally applicable to any element of the algebra, not just vectors and other quaternions, but also lines, planes, circles, spheres, rays, and so on.
 In the conformal model of Euclidean geometry, rotors allow the encoding of rotation, translation and scaling in a single element of the algebra, universally acting on any element. In particular, this means that rotors can represent rotations around an arbitrary axis, whereas quaternions are limited to an axis through the origin.
 Rotor-encoded transformations make interpolation particularly straightforward.
 Rotors carry over naturally to pseudo-Euclidean spaces, for example, the Minkowski space of special relativity. In such spaces rotors can be used to efficiently represent Lorentz boosts, and to interpret formulas involving the gamma matrices.

For further detail about the geometrical uses of Clifford algebras, see Geometric algebra.

Brauer group 

The quaternions are "essentially" the only (non-trivial) central simple algebra (CSA) over the real numbers, in the sense that every CSA over the real numbers is Brauer equivalent to either the real numbers or the quaternions. Explicitly, the Brauer group of the real numbers consists of two classes, represented by the real numbers and the quaternions, where the Brauer group is the set of all CSAs, up to equivalence relation of one CSA being a matrix ring over another. By the Artin–Wedderburn theorem (specifically, Wedderburn's part), CSAs are all matrix algebras over a division algebra, and thus the quaternions are the only non-trivial division algebra over the real numbers.

CSAs – finite dimensional rings over a field, which are simple algebras (have no non-trivial 2-sided ideals, just as with fields) whose center is exactly the field – are a noncommutative analog of extension fields, and are more restrictive than general ring extensions. The fact that the quaternions are the only non-trivial CSA over the real numbers (up to equivalence) may be compared with the fact that the complex numbers are the only non-trivial finite field extension of the real numbers.

Quotations

See also 

 Conversion between quaternions and Euler angles
 Dual quaternion
 Dual-complex number
 Exterior algebra
 Hurwitz quaternion order
 Hyperbolic quaternion
 Lénárt sphere
 Pauli matrices
 Quaternionic manifold
 Quaternionic matrix
 Quaternionic polytope
 Quaternionic projective space
 Rotations in 4-dimensional Euclidean space
 Slerp
 Split-quaternion
 Tesseract

Notes

References

Further reading

Books and publications

Hamilton, William Rowan (1853), "Lectures on Quaternions". Royal Irish Academy.
Hamilton (1866) Elements of Quaternions University of Dublin Press. Edited by William Edwin Hamilton, son of the deceased author.
Hamilton (1899) Elements of Quaternions volume I, (1901) volume II. Edited by Charles Jasper Joly; published by Longmans, Green & Co.
Tait, Peter Guthrie (1873), "An elementary treatise on quaternions". 2d ed., Cambridge, [Eng.] : The University Press.
Maxwell, James Clerk (1873), "A Treatise on Electricity and Magnetism". Clarendon Press, Oxford.
Tait, Peter Guthrie (1886), "". M.A. Sec. R.S.E. Encyclopædia Britannica, Ninth Edition, 1886, Vol. XX, pp. 160–164. (bzipped PostScript file)

 (See section on quaternions.)

Crowe, Michael J. (1967), A History of Vector Analysis: The Evolution of the Idea of a Vectorial System, University of Notre Dame Press. Surveys the major and minor vector systems of the 19th century (Hamilton, Möbius, Bellavitis, Clifford, Grassmann, Tait, Peirce, Maxwell, Macfarlane, MacAuley, Gibbs, Heaviside).

 (review).
 

For molecules that can be regarded as classical rigid bodies molecular dynamics computer simulation employs quaternions.  They were first introduced for this purpose by

Links and monographs

  Notices and materials related to Quaternion conference presentations
 
 
 
 Quaternions for Computer Graphics and Mechanics (Gernot Hoffman)
 
 
  3D Raytraced Quaternion Julia Fractals
  Great page explaining basic math with links to straight forward rotation conversion formulae.
  
 
 
 
 
   
 
 
 David Erickson, Defence Research and Development Canada (DRDC), Complete derivation of rotation matrix from unitary quaternion representation in DRDC TR 2005-228 paper. 
 
 
 
  Part II (PDF; using Hamilton's terminology, which differs from the modern usage)
  two expository papers about continuous functional calculus and spectral theory in quanternionic Hilbert spaces useful in rigorous quaternionic quantum mechanics.
 Quaternions the Android app shows the quaternion corresponding to the orientation of the device.
 Rotating Objects Using Quaternions article speaking to the use of Quaternions for rotation in video games/computer graphics.

External links

 Paulson, Lawrence C. Quaternions (Formal proof development in Isabelle/HOL, Archive of Formal Proofs) 
 Quaternions – Visualisation

Composition algebras
 
William Rowan Hamilton